Dasu or Dassu (Abasin Kohistani, Urdu and ) is the district headquarters of Upper Kohistan District, Khyber Pakhtunkhwa, Pakistan. It had 15 Union Councils before the separation of the Kandia valley. Since its being named as Tehsil, the Dasu subdivision has 11 Union Councils. The total population of Dasu according to 1998 Census was 137,519, in 21,487 households.

Climate
With a mild and generally warm and temperate climate, Dasu features a humid subtropical climate (Cfa) under the Köppen climate classification. The average temperature in Dasu is 19.5 °C, while the annual precipitation averages 648 mm. Even in the driest months, there is a lot of precipitation. November is the driest month with 13 mm of precipitation, while July, the wettest month, has an average precipitation of 93 mm.

July is the hottest month of the year with an average temperature of 29.4 °C. The coldest month January has an average temperature of 7.7 °C.

See also
Dasu Dam
Dasu bus attack

References 

Tehsils of Khyber Pakhtunkhwa
Populated places in Upper Kohistan District